The Port of Fuzhou is a natural seaport centered on the estuary of the Minjiang River artificial deep-water international seaport on the coast of Fuzhou, Fujian, People's Republic of China. and of the neighboring prefecture of Ningde. The Port is located on the southeastern coast of Fujian, facing the Taiwan Strait. Fuzhou is the Mainland port closest to Taiwan, being just 149 Nautical miles from Keelung.

In 2013, Fuzhou port had a total cargo throughput of 127 million tonnes, an annual increase of 11.82%.  Container traffic with Taiwan was 332,500 TEU, an increase of 6.09%. and the regular ferry route between Pingtan wharf and Taichung and Taipei in Taiwan had 144,400 passengers, and increase of 4.09%. The port is part of the Maritime Silk Road.

History 
The Port of Ningde merged with the Port of Fuzhou in 2009

Layout

In 2012 it had 178 production berths, of which 46 were deep-water berths of 10,000DWT or over, of which 18 50,000DWT or over, of which in turn 14 had 100,000DWT capacity. Of the 77 shallow-water berths, 47 could handle 1,000DWT or more.
 
The Jiangyin channel permits container ships of up to 150,000DWT, Luoyuanwan channel allows bulk carriers of up to 300,000DWT and Fuqingwan 100,000DWT channel is currently being dredged.

The Port of Fuzhou has nine port areas within and without the Minjiang estuary, and extends beyond Fuzhou Prefecture to neighboring Ningde.
 Pingtan Port Area
 Jiangyin Port Area or New Fuzhou Port
 Songxia Port Area
 Minjiangkounei Port Area
 Luoyuanwan Port Area
 Sanduao Port Area: Ningde
 Baima Port Area: Ningde
 Sansha Port Area: Ningde
 Sacheng Port Area: Ningde

References

External links
Fuzhou Port Group Co., Ltd. website
Fujian Fuzhou Port Management Bureau website
Fuzhou Xingang Container Terminal Company website

Ports and harbours of China
Transport in Fuzhou